SM U-137 was a Type U 127 U-boat of the Imperial German Navy during World War I. Her construction was ordered on 27 May 1916 and her keel was laid down by Kaiserliche Werft Danzig. She was launched on 16 December 1916 and she was commissioned on 8 January 1918. She made no war patrols.

References

Notes

Citations

Bibliography

Type U 127 submarines
U-boats commissioned in 1918
World War I submarines of Germany
1916 ships
Ships built in Danzig